The Men's 1997 World Amateur Boxing Championships were held in Budapest, Hungary from October 18 to October 26. The ninth edition of this competition, a year after the Summer Olympics in Atlanta, Georgia, was organised by the world governing body for amateur boxing AIBA. The tournament saw the increase in the age limit of boxers from (32) years to (35) years of age.

Medal table

Medal winners

External links 
Results on Amateur Boxing

World Amateur Boxing Championships
AIBA World Boxing Championships
Boxing Championships
International sports competitions in Budapest
International boxing competitions hosted by Hungary
October 1997 sports events in Europe
1990s in Budapest